Proprioseiopsis detritus is a species of mite in the family Phytoseiidae.

References

detritus
Articles created by Qbugbot
Animals described in 1961